High Speed is a 1932 American Pre-Code crime film directed by D. Ross Lederman.

Cast
 Buck Jones as Bill Toomey (as Charles 'Buck' Jones)
 Loretta Sayers as Peggy Preston
 Wallace MacDonald as Tom Corliss
 Pat O'Malley as Paul Whipple
 Edward LeSaint as Police Captain Blaine (as Ed Le Saint)
 Will Walling as Mr. Preston (as William Walling)
 Ward Bond as Ham
 Dick Dickinson as Walter F. Kane
 Martin Faust as Kelly
 Joe Bordeaux as Tony Orlando (uncredited)
 Mickey Rooney as Buddy Whipple (uncredited)
 Eddy Chandler as Steve Macey (uncredited)

References

External links
 

1932 films
1932 crime films
American auto racing films
American crime films
American black-and-white films
1930s English-language films
Films directed by D. Ross Lederman
1930s American films